Lorinne Cecilia Dills Vozoff (born 18 September 1932) is an American film and television actress.

Early life
Lorinne was born on September 18, 1932 in Decatur, Illinois.

Career
She has married John William Murray on June 13, 1953, and she was divorced on September 9, 1954. On July 30, 1955, she married Jerome Walter Vozoff, and they have one daughter Kate Vozoff.

Filmography

Film

Television

References

External links
 

1932 births
Living people
American film actresses
American television actresses
Actresses from Illinois
21st-century American women